The Troy and Greenfield Railroad, chartered in 1848, ran from Greenfield, Massachusetts, United States, to the Vermont state line. It was leased to the Troy and Boston Railroad in 1856, then consolidated into Fitchburg Railroad 1887 which in turn was acquired by Boston and Maine Railroad by lease in 1900.

Station list
Troy, New York
Lansingburg, New York
Melrose, New York
East Schaghticoke, New York
Valley Falls, New York
Johnsonville, New York
Buskirk, New York
East Buskirk, New York
Eagle Bridge, New York
Hoosick Junction, New York
Hoosick Falls, New York
Hoosick, New York
Petersburg Junction, New York
North Pownal, Vermont
Pownal, Vermont
Williamstown, Massachusetts
Blackington Station, Massachusetts 
Greylock Station, Massachusetts
North Adams, Massachusetts
Hoosac Tunnel
Hoosac Tunnel Station Connection with Hoosac Tunnel and Wilmington Railroad
Zoar Station, Massachusetts
Charlemont, Massachusetts
Buckland, Massachusetts
Shelburne Falls, Massachusetts
Bardwells Ferry, Massachusetts
South River, Massachusetts Connection with Conway Electric Street Railway
West Deerfield, Massachusetts
Greenfield, Massachusetts

References

External links

Boston and Maine timetable map - 1942 (Passenger Railroads of the 1930s-1940s in North America)

Defunct Massachusetts railroads
Predecessors of the Boston and Maine Railroad
Railway companies established in 1848
Railway companies disestablished in 1862
Greenfield, Massachusetts